Elections to Devon County Council were held on Thursday, 5 May 1977.  The whole council of ninety-eight members was up for election and the result was that the Conservatives comfortably retained their control, winning eighty-five seats, a gain of twenty-eight, of which seventeen were from Labour and eight from the Liberals. Labour ended with only three county councillors, the Liberals with two, and eight Independents were elected, down from eleven.

Election result

|}

References

1977
Devon
1970s in Devon